"Sugarcane" is a song by Ghanaian singer and songwriter Camidoh, featuring the Nigerian record producer Phantom, released in 2021 by Grind Don't Stop Records, through Crux Global, and MOVES Recordings. A remix, with Mayorkun, and Darkoo, featuring the Ghanaian singer King Promise, was released in 2022. The song gained popularity across TikTok, following the release of the remix.

In 2022 the remixed version debuted at number 16 in Nigeria, on the TurnTable Top 50 chart on 9 May, and reached number 4 on 18 May. It also debuted at number 20 on the UK Afrobeats Singles Chart on 1 May, and reached number 12 on 8 May. It debuted at number 18 on the Billboard U.S. Afrobeats Songs on the week of May 21. He performed a live version of Sugarcane (remix) on Glitch Africa, on 23 May 2022. In review for NotJustOk, Ademoye Afeez said "Camidoh delivers thrilling live performance".

Background
"Sugarcane" was released on 19 November 2021, and produced by Phantom. A music video for "Sugarcane" was released on 17 February 2022, it was directed by Jwillz. "Sugarcane" video is Camidoh's most viewed video with over 2.1 million YouTube streams as of May 2022. The song was accomplished with a remix with Nigerian singer Mayorkun, and British rapper Darkoo, and feature's Ghanaian singer King Promise, released on 8 April 2022 by Grind Don't Stop Records, through Crux Global, and MOVES Recordings.

Impact
The original version featuring the Nigerian record producer Phantom, was endorsed by Akon, during a question-and-answer session on Twitter Spaces with social media influencer, KalyJay, on Thursday, 24 February 2022, Akon said "I have that record, and it is one of my top ten records that I play every day". He also acknowledged Camidoh’s effort in putting up such an amazing record.

Dance routine
A dance routine for the song was created by Tiktoker Sabrina, which has been used in several videos with the hashtag #Sugarcanechallenge. The dance routine was endorsed by other content creators, and choreographers, including Incredible Zigi, who also participated in the dance routine. As of 31 May 2021, the TikTok challenge has received 38.5M TikTok views.

Accolades

Commercial performance
On 16 February 2022, "Sugarcane" debuted on Adom Airplay Chart, at number 2. As of 23 February 2022, "Sugarcane" had reached number 2 on Citi Top 10 Countdown on Citi FM and Citi Countdown show on Citi TV, airplay show.  On 14 May 2022, it was ranked at number 2 on Nigerian TheCable's list of 10 TCL radio pick of the week. "Sugarcane" became Camidoh most-streamed song on all digital streaming platforms. "Sugarcane (remix)" became Ghana second entry on the Spotify Nigeria chart at number 1. "Sugarcane (remix)" reached number one on Apple Music Top 100 Nigeria chart. On 1 May 2022, it debuted at number 20 on the UK Afrobeats Singles chart.

On 3 May 2022, it debuted at number 44 on the TurnTable Top 50 Streaming Songs chart. On 8 May 2022, it debuted at number 18 on the Billboard U.S. Afrobeats Songs chart. On 9 May 2022, it debuted at number 16 on Nigeria TurnTable Top 50 chart. On 17 May 2022, it debuted at number 14 on the TurnTable Top 50 Airplay.  "Sugarcane" has received 8.6 million Boomplay streams as of 31 May 2022, and "Sugarcane (remix)" has received 13.5 million Boomplay streams as of 31 May 2022.

Charts

Weekly charts

Year-end charts

Release history

References

2021 songs
2021 singles
Camidoh songs
Nigerian afropop songs
Ghanaian songs
2022 songs
2022 singles